Ceratophorus is a genus of dinoflagellates.

References 

Gonyaulacales
Dinoflagellate genera